Neate is a surname. Notable people with the surname include:

 Adam Neate (born 1977), British painter, conceptual artist, and street artist
 Andy Neate (born 1974), British racing driver
 Charles Neate (1806–1879), English politician and academic
 Charles Neate (musician) (1784–1877), British pianist and composer
 Clarry Neate (1904–1972), South Australian racehorse trainer and caricaturist
 Kenneth Neate (1914–1997), Australian operatic and concert tenor, opera producer and singing teacher
 Patrick Neate (born 1970), British novelist, journalist, playwright and podcaster
 Patrick Neate (cricketer) (born 1946), former English cricketer

See also
 Neat (disambiguation)
 NEET
 Ryan Neates